Emmons School District 33 is a K-8 school district located in the central region of the village Antioch, which is, in turn, located in Lake County, Illinois. There is one school located in Emmons School District 33, which serves all grades from kindergarten to eight, and encompasses a kindergarten program: it is known as Emmons Grade School, alternatively known as Emmons Elementary School or simply Emmons School. The principal/superintendent as of September 2019 is Dr. Janean Friedman; the mascot of the school and district is the raider.

External links
Emmons School District 33 Home Page

References

Emmons School District 33 Heading, retrieved 2008-5-11

School districts in Lake County, Illinois